Ayler is a surname. Notable people with the surname include:

 Albert Ayler (1936–1970), American jazz saxophonist, singer, and composer
 Donald Ayler (1942–2007), American jazz trumpeter, brother of Albert
 Ethel Ayler (1930–2018), American actress

See also
 Aylor (disambiguation)
 Aylmer